Aye Myat Thu (born 14 September 1986) is a Myanmar Academy Award winning Burmese actress and model, who has acted in videos, movies and television series throughout her career. She entered the entertainment industry through modeling and beauty pageants after completing her matriculation exam.

Political activities

Following the 2021 Myanmar coup d'état, she participated in the anti-coup movement both in person at rallies and through social media. Denouncing the military coup, she took part in protests, starting in February. She joined the "We Want Justice" three-finger salute movement. The movement was launched on social media, and many celebrities have joined the movement.

On 16 April 2021, warrants for her arrest were issued under Section 505 (a) of the Myanmar Penal Code by the State Administration Council for speaking out against the military coup. Along with several other celebrities, she was charged with calling for participation in the Civil Disobedience Movement (CDM) and damaging the state's ability to govern, with supporting the Committee Representing Pyidaungsu Hluttaw, and with generally inciting the people to disturb the peace and stability of the nation.

Filmography

Films
Chu Si (ချူဆီ) (2018)
Toe Kyaw Man Nae Nan San Tae Ywar (2018)
 (နောင်တွင်ဥဒါန်းတွင်စေသတည်း) (2018)
 Two Weeks Notice (2019)

Television series
Expedition Myanmar (2017)
It was on Yesterday (2017)
It was on Yesterday 2 (2018)

Awards and nominations

References

External links
 

Living people
1986 births
Burmese film actresses
Burmese female models